Jorge Andrés Segura Portocarrero (born 18 January 1997) is a Colombian professional footballer who plays as a center back and is a free agent.

Club career
In March 2017, it was confirmed that Segura would be joining Watford from that summer. In September 2020, after loan spells to Spain and Mexico, Segura returned to Colombia on loan, joining Atlético Nacional on loan until June 2021. In 2023, his contract with Watford was terminated.

References

External links

1997 births
Living people
Colombian footballers
Association football defenders
Colombia under-20 international footballers
Categoría Primera A players
Segunda División B players
Liga MX players
Envigado F.C. players
Watford F.C. players
Real Valladolid Promesas players
Independiente Medellín footballers
Atlas F.C. footballers
Atlético Nacional footballers
América de Cali footballers
Colombian expatriate footballers
Expatriate footballers in Spain
Expatriate footballers in Mexico
Sportspeople from Valle del Cauca Department